Joye Cottage is one of the oldest, and largest winter retreats in Aiken, South Carolina. Most of the sprawling property dates to 1897, when William Collins Whitney purchased the property and remodeled it extensively.  It now includes a main house, a stable, a greenhouse, a laundry house, a couple of one-story cottages, and a squash court. The property was listed on the National Register of Historic Places in 1980.

References

Houses in Aiken County, South Carolina
Georgian architecture in South Carolina
Prairie School architecture in South Carolina
Houses completed in 1897
Houses on the National Register of Historic Places in South Carolina
National Register of Historic Places in Aiken County, South Carolina
Buildings and structures in Aiken, South Carolina